Putevi Užice is a Serbian construction company headquartered in Užice, Serbia.

History
Putevi Užice was founded in 1962 in Titovo Užice, SFR Yugoslavia. It operated as government-owned enterprise until 1992 and since 1998 it operated as joint-stock company.

Putevi Užice was admitted to the open market of the Belgrade Stock Exchange on July 21, 2004.

Activities 
The Putevi Užice company constructs bridges, tunnels, airports, stadiums, official buildings and roads; in addition, it offers a road infrastructure maintenance service and produces construction materials such as stone, concrete and asphalt.

64.47% of the capital of Putevi Užice is held by Putevi centar d.o.o. Beograd and 19.44% by natural persons.

Subsidiaries
This is a list of companies that are owned by Putevi Užice:
 Novi Pazar-put a.d.
 Putevi Požega a.d. (minority)
 Putevi Bijelo Polje d.o.o. Montenegro

References

External links
 

1962 establishments in Yugoslavia
Companies based in Užice
Construction and civil engineering companies established in 1962
Construction and civil engineering companies of Serbia